Salvadoran Mexicans (Spanish: salvadoreño-mexicanos) are people of Salvadorian descent living in Mexico.

Migration history
The largest wave of Salvadorans arrived in Mexico as refugees during the Salvadoran Civil War.

Demographics
During the 2010 Census, there were 8,088 El Salvador-born individuals registered as living in Mexico. According to the Salvadoran consul in Mexico José Antonio Domínguez Mena, as of December 2016 only 10% to 15% of Salvadoran nationals were registered with the Instituto Nacional de Migración.

Institutions 
 Asociación Salvadoreña Mexicana, A. C.
 Asociación de Salvadoreños residentes en Jalisco

See also
El Salvador–Mexico relations

References

 
Ethnic groups in Mexico
Mexico
Immigration to Mexico